MSgt. Willie Rogers (April 12, 1915 – November 18, 2016) was a member of the famed group of World War II-era African-Americans known as the Tuskegee Airmen. He was shot twice in Italy during World War II.

Military service

Rogers was drafted into the United States Army 1942. He was sent to the European theater of the war, and served in a support role in logistics.

During a mission in Italy in 1943, he was wounded in action. He was shot twice, once in the stomach and once in the leg by German soldiers. Rogers spent several months recovering in a London Hospital.

Rogers arrived at the Dachau concentration camp in Germany shortly after it was liberated by American troops April 29, 1945. He and a contingent of Americans took an inventory of the camp.

Rogers did not tell his family that he was a member of the Tuskegee Airmen until 2012. There is a portrait of Rogers hanging in the St. Petersburg Museum of History.

Controversy
It was reported that Rogers was part of the 100th Fighter Squadron. However after his death historians were unsure about Rogers place in the history of the Tuskegee airmen. In 2017 it was confirmed that he as part of the 96th Air Service Group providing support to the pilots and air crews. Because Rogers never talked about his service until 2012, the story of his participation with the 100th Fighter Squadron was retold over and over.

Awards
Congressional Gold Medal awarded to the Tuskegee Airmen in 2006

Education
Claflin College of Agriculture and Mechanical Institute
Tuskegee Institute (1942)

Personal life
Rogers was married and had children. He returned to Florida after WWII and opened Rogers’ Radio Sales and Service in St. Petersburg. He was a lifelong member of the African Methodist Episcopal Church. In 2016 at 101 years old Rogers died of a stroke.

See also
 List of Tuskegee Airmen
 Military history of African Americans
 The Tuskegee Airmen (movie)

References

Notes

External links
 Tuskegee Airmen at Tuskegee University
 Tuskegee Airmen Archives at the University of California, Riverside Libraries.
 Tuskegee Airmen, Inc.
 Tuskegee Airmen National Historic Site (U.S. National Park Service) 
 Tuskegee Airmen National Museum
 Fly (2009 play about the 332d Fighter Group)
 Executive Order 9981
 List of African American Medal of Honor recipients
 Military history of African Americans

1915 births
2016 deaths
United States Army personnel of World War II
People from Arkansas
Tuskegee Airmen
Tuskegee University alumni
Military personnel from Tuskegee, Alabama
Congressional Gold Medal recipients
African-American centenarians
Men centenarians